Harvey Alexander Bennett Sr. (July 23, 1925 – November 21, 2004) was a Canadian professional ice hockey goaltender who played for the Boston Bruins of the National Hockey League.

Perhaps Bennett's most famous feat was surrendering Maurice Richard's goal that established scoring 50 goals in 50 games. This goal was scored for the Bruins' nemesis Montreal Canadiens on March 18, 1945.

Bennett was inducted into the American Hockey League Hall of Fame in 2013 and the Rhode Island Hockey Hall of Fame in 2018.

Family
He was born in Ettington, Saskatchewan and married Diana Helen Sullivan (youngest of nine sisters). Of his six sons, Harvey Bennett Jr., Curt Bennett, and Bill Bennett all played in the NHL. John Bennett played in the WHA, and Jimmy Bennett was a 1977 draft pick of the Atlanta Flames who played professionally in the International Hockey League with the Muskegon Mohawks and also in the old Central Hockey League with the Birmingham Bulls. His youngest son, Peter Bennett, drowned after falling through ice.

References

External links

Obituary at LostHockey.com

Boston Bruins players
Boston Olympics players
Ice hockey people from Saskatchewan
Providence Reds players
Canadian ice hockey goaltenders
1925 births
2004 deaths